Ernest Moore may refer to:

 Ernest Moore (painter) (1865-1940), British painter
 Ernest Moore (professor), former congressional aide and college professor
 Ernest Carroll Moore, American philosophy and education professor, founder of University of California, Los Angeles
 Ernest E. Moore (1881–1962), American attorney and politician in Vermont
 Ernest Eugene "Gene" Moore Jr. American trauma surgeon
 Ernest Robert Moore (1869–1957), American politician and banker